Harald Madsen  (born 1953 or 1954) is a Norwegian handball player and coach.

He made his debut on the Norwegian national team in 1979, 
and played 17 matches for the national team between 1979 and 1981. 

He coached Urædd Håndball in the 1980s and 1990s. From 1994 to 1997 he was assigned as head coach for the Norway men's national handball team. He led the team to and during the 1997 World Men's Handball Championship.

References

Year of birth missing (living people)
Living people
Norwegian male handball players
Norwegian handball coaches